Pericine is one of a number of indole alkaloids found in the tree Picralima nitida, commonly known as akuamma. As with some other alkaloids from this plant such as akuammine, pericine has been shown to bind to mu opioid receptors in vitro, and has an IC50 of 0.6 μmol, within the range of a weak analgesic. It may also have convulsant effects.

Pericine has been prepared in the laboratory by total synthesis.

See also 
 Vobasine
 Isovoacristine

References 

Opioids
Indole alkaloids
Alkaloids found in Apocynaceae
Bridged heterocyclic compounds
Mu-opioid receptor agonists
Azocines